CA Spora Luxembourg was a football club, based in Luxembourg City, in southern Luxembourg.  It is now a part of Racing FC Union Luxembourg.

History

Spora was founded in 1923 as an amalgam of Racing Club Luxembourg and Sporting Club Luxembourg, two of the leading lights of early Luxembourgish football.  For the first seventeen years of existence, Spora would battle with FA Red Boys Differdange for ultimate ascendancy in Luxembourgish football.  Although Red Boys won more trophies in this period, Spora picked up almost every piece of silverware that Red Boys didn't, with seven league titles and three Luxembourg Cups in just fifteen years.

During the German occupation of Luxembourg, the club played in the Gauliga Moselland under the name of Moselland Luxemburg.

After the Second World War, Spora continued to win titles (albeit less frequently than before).  To its pre-war haul, the club added four more championships and won the Luxembourg Cup another five times.  In 1956, Spora recorded one of the most celebrated European club results in Luxembourgish history, as it beat the West German champions, Borussia Dortmund.

In 2005, Spora merged with two other clubs from Luxembourg City, CS Alliance 01 and Union Luxembourg, to form Spora's modern incarnation, Racing FC Union Luxembourg.

Honours
National Division
Winners (11): 1924–25, 1927–28, 1928–29, 1933–34, 1934–35, 1935–36, 1937–38, 1948–49, 1955–56, 1960–61, 1988–89
Runners-up (10): 1923–24, 1925–26, 1929–30, 1930–31, 1932–33, 1944–45, 1951–52, 1958–59, 1966–67, 1987–88

Luxembourg Cup
Winners (8): 1927–28, 1931–32, 1939–40, 1949–50, 1956–57, 1964–65, 1965–66, 1979–80
Runners-up (8): 1924–25, 1928–29, 1929–30, 1930–31, 1933–34, 1944–45, 1962–63, 1986–87

As Racing Club Luxembourg
National Division
Winners (1): 1909–10

Luxembourg Cup
Winners (1): 1921–22

As Sporting Club Luxembourg
National Division
Winners (2): 1910–11, 1918–19
Runners-up (3): 1911–12, 1913–14, 1915–16

European competitions

Spora qualified for UEFA European competition eleven times.

UEFA Champions League
First round (3): 1956–57, 1961–62, 1989–90

UEFA Cup Winners' Cup
First round (3): 1965–66, 1966–67, 1980–81

UEFA Cup
First round (5): 1964–65, 1967–68, 1987–88, 1991–92, 1992–93

Spora won two games in Europe.  In 1956–57, the team surprisingly won the second leg of their tie against West German champions Borussia Dortmund 2–1, having lost the first leg 4–3 in Germany.  Under today's system, using the away goals rule, Spora would have gone through.  However, in 1956, matches were replayed, and Spora was dispatched 7–0.  Spora's second victory was in the 1964–65 UEFA Cup, when it won its second leg against FC Basel 1–0, but went out nonetheless, having lost the first leg 2–0.

Managers

 Josef Frühwirth (1938)
 Willi Macho (1955–57)
 András Béres (1960–62)
 Carlo Weis (1987–88)
 Wieslaw Chadakowski (1989–90)
 Heinz Eimer (1991–92)
 Jean Fiedler (1992–93)
 François Zdun (1993–97)
 Florim Alijaj (2001–02)
 Heinz Eimer (2002–04)
 Jean Sabbatucci (2004)
 Alain Happe (2004–05)
 Bernard Wégria (2005)

References

Defunct football clubs in Luxembourg
Spora
Association football clubs established in 1923
Association football clubs disestablished in 2005
Football clubs from former German territories
1923 establishments in Luxembourg
2005 disestablishments in Luxembourg

de:RFC Union Luxemburg#Spora Luxemburg